Audincourt is a commune in the Doubs department in the Bourgogne-Franche-Comté region in eastern France.

History

Audincourt belonged to the County of Montbéliard which became part of France in 1793, during the French Revolutionary Wars.

Population

Economy
An iron foundry was established early in the nineteenth century to refine the ore from the rich mines near Bethoncourt.

Personalities 
 Alassane N'Diaye, footballer 
 Camel Meriem, footballer
 Irène Tharin, politician

See also
 Communes of the Doubs department

References

External links

 Official website 

Communes of Doubs
County of Montbéliard